Gavin Buckley (born 8 February 1963) is a South African-born Australian-American politician and former restaurateur who has been the mayor of Annapolis, Maryland since 2017. Born in South Africa and raised primarily in Perth, Western Australia, he moved to Annapolis in 1992, eventually opening multiple bars and restaurants in the city.

A Democrat, he was elected mayor in 2017, his first bid at elected office, defeating incumbent Republican mayor Mike Pantelides. He was re-elected in 2021.

As mayor, Buckley has worked to allow denser development in the City Dock district, drawing opposition from historic preservation advocates. He was in office during the Capital Gazette shooting on 28 June 2018, and has advocated for stricter gun control laws in its wake.

Early life and education
Gavin Buckley was born in Boksburg, South Africa, and lived briefly in London before growing up in Perth, Western Australia. Because their father traveled often for work and then died at an early age, Buckley and his twin, Paul, who died at age 14, were primarily raised by their mother, Pauline Brosnan, an Irish native active in the Australian Labor Party. Gavin was expelled from two Australian high schools, St. Norbert and Belmont Senior High School, for poor attendance; and began working in the countries of Scotland and France, and the U.S. State of Florida, where he arrived in 1985.

Career

Business 
Buckley came to Maryland in 1992 by boat, with only 200 dollars in cash; in the region, he found work as a waiter and farm labourer, among other jobs. He overstayed his initial visa, but was granted amnesty under Reagan administration-rules through his agricultural work, and was naturalized in 2009.

Buckley eventually settled in Annapolis, Maryland, where he began a business career, first opening a coffee shop called The Moon, and later four restaurants, Tsunami Seafood, Metropolitan Kitchen and Lounge, Lemongrass Thai, and Sailor Oyster Bar, in the West Street area. He was one of several partners in West Village LLC, which renovated a strip of dilapidated buildings on West Street near Tsunami in 2001 and restored a variety of businesses to what had become a "relatively desolate" part of the city. Buckley's businesses accrued several debts and contract disputes between 2006 and 2012, which he attributed to cash flow problems due to the Great Recession. Buckley was also cited by local authorities for failing to display boat registration numbers and failing to obtain a rental license.

A dispute with the local Historic Preservation Committee in 2015 over a large mural on the outside of Buckley's Tsunami restaurant brought him to public attention in municipal politics. Throughout the controversy, Buckley argued that Annapolis's economic development depended on loosening historic preservation policies, saying "We have to celebrate our history, but you can't get stuck in it."

Politics 

Buckley ran for mayor of Annapolis in 2017 with no prior political experience. He defeated longtime Annapolis State Senator John Astle in a Democratic primary with unusually high turnout, a "stunning" result after a primary campaign in which he presented himself as a contributor to the renewal of downtown Annapolis, a fresh voice from outside the political system, and an ally of underprivileged Annapolitans. In the general election campaign, Buckley proposed a "firestorm" of reform proposals, including replacing curbside parking on busy Main Street with a trolley, that his Republican opponent, incumbent mayor Mike Pantelides, mostly dismissed as unrealistic. The race was unusual for its relative civility, with Buckley and Pantelides dining together publicly. Pantelides's campaign at times contrasted his Annapolis pedigree with Buckley's Australian identity, but Buckley believes this tactic backfired, telling an Australian newspaper "People are very nice to Australians here." Buckley defeated Pantelides by over 1,000 votes in the November election.

In office, Buckley fought to relax zoning restrictions in Annapolis's City Dock area to match those in the West Street area where his restaurants operated, a move he argued was necessary to revitalize economic activity in "the best real estate that the city has". He introduced legislation to do so in a City Council meeting in May 2018, where it was rejected after historic preservationist opponents raised concerns about losing the area's designation as a National Historic Landmark District and pointed out that a "cultural landscape study" mandated by the city's master plan for the area was still underway. Buckley announced his intention to reintroduce the legislation with more sponsors after the study had been completed, and in June the National Trust for Historic Preservation named the district one of "America's Most Endangered Historic Places."

Buckley was in office during the Capital Gazette shooting on 28 June 2018, in which five people were killed at a local newspaper's office. In the aftermath, Buckley requested a federal proclamation allowing flags to be flown at half-mast; he told the press on 2 July that the administration of President Donald Trump—who had repeatedly described press members as "enemies of the people"— had denied the request. Trump's press secretary, Sarah Huckabee Sanders, called Buckley later that day; on the following day, the White House issued the requested proclamation, saying Trump had ordered it as soon as he learned of Buckley's petition. In the wake of the shooting, Buckley called for stronger gun control, blaming the U.S.'s National Rifle Association for opposing legislation restricting gun sales to certain people with mental illnesses, such as the accused Capital Gazette shooter, and suggested looking into gun buyback programs such as those enacted in Australia.

Personal life 
Buckley underwent surgery for intestinal cancer when he was 33 in 1996. A year later, he married Annapolis native Julie Williams and they have two sons; Dash, an avid runner and Miles, a two time colon cancer survivor.

Electoral history

Notes

External links

References

1963 births
20th-century Australian businesspeople
21st-century American businesspeople
21st-century Australian businesspeople
21st-century American politicians
American people of Irish descent
American restaurateurs
Australian emigrants to the United States
Australian people of Irish descent
Businesspeople from Maryland
Living people
Maryland Democrats
Mayors of Annapolis, Maryland
Naturalized citizens of the United States
People from Boksburg
Politicians from Perth, Western Australia
Politicians from Annapolis, Maryland
South African emigrants to Australia
South African emigrants to the United States